Viorel "Tase" Tănase (born 7 October 1970) is a retired Romanian football player, currently a manager.

Honours

Player
Oțelul Galați
Divizia B: 1990–91

External links

Viorel Tanase, un zeu in Pantheonul Otelului

1970 births
Living people
Sportspeople from Galați
Romanian footballers
Association football midfielders
Liga I players
Liga II players
ASC Oțelul Galați players
FC Dinamo București players
FC Argeș Pitești players
Israeli Premier League players
Maccabi Netanya F.C. players
Romanian expatriate footballers
Romanian expatriate sportspeople in Israel
Expatriate footballers in Israel
Romanian football managers
FCV Farul Constanța managers
ASC Oțelul Galați managers
FC Steaua București assistant managers
CSM Deva managers
ACS Viitorul Târgu Jiu managers
Romania international footballers